Amy Reeve Williams Fielding was a female tennis player from the United States who played in the last decade of the 19th century and the first decade of the 20th century.

She was married to Mantle Fielding; they had two children, Richard M. and Frances. After Fielding's death in 1941, she married John Duncan Spaeth in 1942.

Grand Slam finals

Doubles (2 runner-ups)

Mixed doubles (2 runner-ups)

References

External links
 The Winterthur Library Overview of an archival collection on Mantle Fielding.

American female tennis players
Tennis people from Pennsylvania
1872 births
1969 deaths